Calliandra riparia is a species of flowering plants of the genus Calliandra in the family Fabaceae. It is native to Panama, Colombia, Guyana, and Venezuela

References

riparia
Flora of Colombia
Flora of Panama
Flora of Guyana
Flora of Venezuela